Sri Kalyana Venkateswaraswamy Templeis a Hindu-Vaishnavite temple situated at Narayanavanam, a town in Tirupati district of Andhra Pradesh state, India. The Temple is dedicated to Lord Kalyana Venkateswara, an incarnation of Vishnu. The temple is situated at 2 km east of Puttur and 45 km south of Tirupati.  It is believed that Lord Venkateswara married Padmavati at this place and then moved to Tirumala.

Legend 

As per legend, Narayanavanam is the capital of King Akasaraja, who is ruling this region. Akasaraja performed the marriage of his daughter Padmavati, the presiding deity of Padmavathi Temple, Tiruchanur to Lord Venkateswara, the presiding deity of Venkateswara Temple, Tirumala, at this place.

History
The temple was established in the year 1541 AD. It was extended in later times.

Administration
The temple at present is being administered by Tirumala Tirupati Devasthanams.

Poojas and Festivals
Daily rituals are held as per Vaikanasa Agama.

See also
 Hindu Temples in Tirupati
 List of temples under Tirumala Tirupati Devasthanams

References 

Hindu temples in Tirupati district
Tirumala Tirupati Devasthanams